Meitu Inc. is a Chinese technology company established in 2008 and headquartered in Xiamen, Fujian. It makes smartphones and selfie apps. Meitu's photo-editing and sharing software for smartphones is hugely popular in China and other Asian countries, attracting 456 million users who post more than 6 billion photos every month. As of October 31, 2016, Meitu's apps have been activated on over 1.1 billion unique devices worldwide. According to App Annie, Meitu has been repeatedly ranked as one of the top eight iOS non-game app developers globally from June 2014 through October 2016, together with global Internet giants such as Alibaba, Apple, Baidu, Facebook, Google, Microsoft and Tencent. MeituPic, their top app, has 52 million active daily users and 270 million MAU. On December 15, 2016, Meitu went public on the main board of the Hong Kong Stock Exchange. The Hong Kong Exchange has not seen a technology offering of this size in nearly a decade.

Mobile apps
Meitu currently has 13 apps installed on more than 1.1 billion unique devices worldwide, generating approximately 6 billion photos per month. 
According to App Annie, Meitu is the fourth largest app developer in China. Meitu's most popular apps in China include:
 MeituPic: Selected as one of iTunes top 10 apps of the year, Meitu has become one of the most popular photo editing apps of all time giving users access to an incredible suite of professional filters, frames, effects and other tools to turn their smartphone photos into works of art. Available on both Apple and Google Play stores for free. 
 together editing- MeituPic launched a new feature in Aug 2022 which allows multiple users to edit the same picture simultaneously.

 Meipai: Launched in 2014, Meipai has rapidly grown to become the #1 video-based social media platform in China with nearly 8 billion views per month. Meipai offers a suite of editing tools that allow users to design personalized videos and express themselves on the platform. After new terms and conditions for sponsored posts were implemented in 2017, the popularity of the platform declined, with many users moving to other short video apps. In 2018 the app received a redesign which made it more similar to its competitor Douyin. By 2019, Meitu had focused its attention on its original Meitu app, adding social features to it.

Mobile devices

In 2013, Meitu developed its first selfie smartphone called the Meitu Kiss. Since then, Meitu has developed several selfie phones with the two latest models, the T8 and M8, launched in February and May 2017, respectively.

Marketing strategy 

 Target market/Market segmentation:
From the first Meitu phone named MeituKiss launched in May 2013 to Meitu V6 in November 2017, the target customers are female, especially female customers between the ages of 18–25. About 70% of Meitu's phone customers are from this age group.

Meitu phones are marketed for their cameras including photo advanced beautification, Smart fill light automatically and optical image stabilization were developed to meet target customers' needs, furthermore, the release of limited edition versions(like Meitu M8 cartoon editions) also indulged customers' fancy. Meitu believes its understanding of its target customers drives its phone's functions development, as the founder and CEO of Meitu, Xinhong Wu presented that Meitu phones designing more focus on user selfie experience
Marketing Strategy - Price:
Meitu adopt premium pricing in phones selling, towards Meitu phones' high price, Meitu company said that the pricing was based on improving the user experience, and the CEO Xinhong Wu said that Meitu phones' customers are insensitive to price when challenged as to why their new phone cost RMB 5,099 (around USD 805) in 2017.
Marketing Strategy - Distribution(or Place):
Online selling mainly without official physical stores, but Meitu phone has its offline experience Shops, and cooperating with Chinese famous online retailers such as Taobao and Suning.
Marketing Strategy - Digital marketing and Promotion:
Sales promotion:Meitu phones' online selling platforms only run sales promotion in some festivals, activities including discounts, online coupons and freebies, all Meitu phones released with limited amount, such as only 20,000 M8 cartoon limited-edition be sold in May 2017, so the promotion intensity on online selling platforms is always weak, the company mainly use hunger marketing to inspire customers' purchasing desire.
Digital marketing:Meitu company used digital marketing as the method for products promotion, approaches they adopted including search engine optimization (SEO), search engine marketing (SEM), through mobile phone apps and social media marketing.
Meitu company cooperates mainly with Baidu search engine, which targets market in Mainland China, and started the formal cooperation with Google DoubleClick for Publishers from September 2017 and the cooperation targets potential customers in Hong Kong, furthermore, with regard to marketing through mobile phone apps, Meitu company made use of their own brand apps to promote their phones like MeituPic, BeautyPlus and Meipai, and advertising formats including banners ads, pop-up ads and short video ads, but these apps as advertising platrofms not promote their own products only, but also undertake other brands' advertisements like Snickers's advertisement in Meipai.

Meitu phones' advertising mainly through social media platforms like Baidu Paste Bar and Sina Weibo in mainland China, the company invited Angelababy, a famous Chinese actress as the brand ambassador, moreover, Meitu phones with thousands of celebrity customers (most of them are famous stars and bloggers), the popularity of Meitu phones within these celebrity customer group improved the product's awareness, and made the product be more topical within social media platforms.

Celebrity customers have been making contribution in Meitu phone promotion within Sina Weibo, all of them with millions even tens of millions of followers, like the brand ambassador Angelababy, she has more than 8500 million followers in Weibo, while the phones' types could be shown when users post information in Weibo, so when these celebrity customers post Meitu phones' advertisements or use Meitu phones to post other messages, their followers could capture Meitu relevant information, and during the process, the Meitu phone has been promoted, and these famous people's participating also create positive celebrity effect, which could help the Meitu phone grab press attention and improve product's awareness.

Popularity of Meitu apps
Meitu's photo-editing and sharing software for smartphones are hugely popular throughout Asia, particularly in China, Thailand, India, Indonesia, Japan, Malaysia, the Philippines, South Korea, Taiwan and Vietnam with each country being home to more than 10 million users. India has the second highest number of users for the app outside of China and is considered Meitu's biggest overseas market. It has also been downloaded by more than 10 million people in Brazil and the US and globally has more than 500 million users.

Offices
Meitu is based in Xiamen, China. Outside of China, Meitu has set up offices in Brazil, Hong Kong, India, Japan, Indonesia, Singapore and the United States.

Controversy
On January 20, 2017, CNN reported Meitu apps are collecting information about users for advertising purposes, and sends that data back to servers in China. But Meitu denied CNN's report that the app is leaking users' privacy. The company said collecting users' data is to "optimize app performance, its effects and features, and to better understand our consumer engagement with in-app advertisements" in an official statement. The permissions include certain geolocation and app-checking code to comply with advertising network requirements in China, where jailbroken devices can be used to defraud advertisers, and advertisers may demand that their messages be geofenced to appear only in certain regions. Apple confirmed that the app was and remains in compliance.

Meitu's makers are quoted as saying: “Our mission is to make the world a more beautiful place”. Beauty standards in China have become linked to the Meitu definitions of beauty. It has become common practice in China for people, largely women, to take their Meitu edited pictures to plastic surgeons as examples for what they want to look like.

In June 2020, the Government of India banned Meitu app with 58 other Chinese origin apps citing data and privacy issues. The border tensions in 2020 between India and China might have also played a role in the ban.

References

Software companies established in 2008
Chinese companies established in 2008
Manufacturing companies based in Xiamen
Electronics companies of China
Mobile phone companies of China
Mobile phone manufacturers
Chinese brands
Companies listed on the Hong Kong Stock Exchange
Digital marketing
2016 initial public offerings
Internet censorship in India